is a Japanese actor represented by Ricomotion.

Filmography

TV series

NHK

Nippon TV

Tokyo Broadcasting System

Fuji Television

TV Asahi

TV Tokyo

Mainichi Broadcasting System

Films

Internet series

Video games

References

External links
 

Japanese male film actors
Japanese male television actors
Japanese male video game actors
Japanese male voice actors
1962 births
Living people
Male actors from Kyoto
Kyoto University alumni
20th-century Japanese male actors
21st-century Japanese male actors